The following is a list of National Football League mascots:

References

External links

Mascots
 
Lists of mascots